Charles Sellers (November 22, 1888, in White Cloud, Kansas – January 11, 1934) was an American minstrel show performer who worked in blackface under the stage name Charles Mack. He worked with John Swor and later George Moran  as the Two Black Crows.

He married Marian Robinson. They divorced in 1931. He later married Myrtle Buckley on July 24, 1932, in San Diego, California.

He died on January 11, 1934, in Mesa, Arizona, in a car accident. He was driving when a tire blew out and the car overturned several times. His wife was injured but survived. Also in the car were his daughter, Mary Jane Mack, George Moran and Mack Sennett. The funeral arrangements were made by W. C. Fields and William S. Hart. Hart gave the eulogy and Noah Beery sang. He was buried in Forest Lawn Memorial Park in Glendale, California. His estate was valued at $50,000 (approximately $ today).

References

External links

Blackface minstrel performers
Road incident deaths in Arizona
Burials at Forest Lawn Memorial Park (Glendale)
1888 births
1934 deaths
20th-century American male singers
20th-century American singers